Italia Lucchini (8 December 1918 – 29 April 1998) was an Italian sprinter.

Biography
She won bronze medal in the 4×100 metres relay, first medal of ever for the Italian women in a relay race, at the 1938 European Athletics Championships in Vienna, with Maria Apollonio, Rosetta Cattaneo and Maria Alfero She has 7 caps in national team from 1938 to 1942.

Achievements

National titles
Italia Lucchini has won 3 times the individual national championship.
3 wins in the 100 metres (1939, 1941, 1942)

See also
 Italy national relay team

References

External links
 

1918 births
Year of death missing
People from Marino, Lazio
Italian female sprinters
European Athletics Championships medalists
Sportspeople from the Metropolitan City of Rome Capital
20th-century Italian women